Scotoderma is a monospecific genus of fungi in the Stereaceae family, containing only the species Scotoderma viride.

References

Monotypic Russulales genera
Stereaceae